The Sistema Bibliotecario Consortile Antonio Panizzi is a public library system in the Province of Varese, Italy. The system headquarters are in Gallarate. It is named after Sir Anthony Panizzi.

Branches
The system has libraries in:
Albizzate
Arsago Seprio
Besnate
Cairate
Cardano al Campo
Carnago
Casorate Sempione
Cassano Magnago
Cavaria con Premezzo
Ferno
Gallarate
Jerago con Orago
Lonate Pozzolo
Oggiona con Santo Stefano
Samarate
Solbiate Arno

References

External links

 Sistema Bibliotecario Consortile Antonio Panizzi 

Province of Varese
Libraries in Lombardy